Jacques Anderson Yoboue N'da (born 19 April 1984) is an Ivorian footballer. He plays for US Témara.

Career
N'da played in his first professional season for IR Tanger and joined FC Azziz Kara in January 2009. He stayed with FC AK until July 2009, then joined Bidvest Wits. He was released from Bidvest Wits in September and signed on 11 September 2009 with Mpumalanga Black Aces F.C. After four months in the ABSA Premiership for Mpumalanga Black Aces F.C. he returned in January 2010 to Morocco and signed with US Témara.

References 

1984 births
Living people
Ivorian footballers
Ivorian expatriates in South Africa
Expatriate footballers in Morocco
Bidvest Wits F.C. players
Footballers from Abidjan
Expatriate soccer players in South Africa
Association football forwards
Ivorian expatriates in Morocco
F.C. AK players
Ittihad Tanger players